Namerikawa may refer to: 
 Namerikawa, Toyama
 Namerikawa, Kanagawa